Concord of the State is a 1642 oil-on-panel painting by Rembrandt, now in the Museum Boijmans Van Beuningen in Rotterdam. It measures 74.6 cm x 101 cm and is signed and dated "REMBRANDT F. 164(.)". In terms of style and theme it is linked to The Night Watch – both paintings include symbolism and allegories of the Dutch Republic and Amsterdam.

Bibliography
 Roberta D'Adda, Rembrandt, Milano, Skira, 2006.

Paintings by Rembrandt
1642 paintings
Paintings in the collection of the Museum Boijmans Van Beuningen